Just Gettin' It On is the rerelease of Playa Fly's 1995 independent album, Just gettin it on. Fly goes under the name "Lil' Fly" on most of the album, being that was his title during that year. Just Gettin' It On was released in 1999 on Diamond Records with a bonus track, "Fuck A Wanna Be".

Track listing
 "Gettin' It On" (Featuring Gangsta Blac & Bill Chill) – 5:56
 "Gettin' It On Outro" – 2:15
 "Fuck A Wanna Be" – 4:47
 "Catch you Slippin'" (Featuring Lil' Ced, Terror, & Gangsta Blac) – 5:39
 "Just Awaken Shaken" – 4:14
 "Shout Outs" – 3:19
 "Ana 'Ho" (Featuring A.J, Kuno, & Lil' Yo) – 6:59
 "Sho' is Funky" (Featuring Gangsta Blac & Bill Chill) – 7:09
 "Odes to the Triple Bitches" – 0:59
 "Triple Bitch Mafia" – 7:01
 "Damn What A Nigga Say" (Featuring Playa Posse) – 13:45
 "Gettin' It On (Radio Edit)" – 4:35

Playa Fly albums
1995 albums
1999 albums